Mill Park, Victoria, is a suburb of Melbourne, Australia.

Mill Park may also refer to:

Mill Park, Portland, Oregon, a neighborhood in the United States
Mill Park (Portland, Oregon), a public park in the Portland, Oregon neighborhood of the same name
Mill Park, Bathgate, a former association football venue in Scotland
Mill Park station, a former railroad station on the Colebrookdale Railroad in Pennsylvania, United States

See also
Millpark Cricket Club, a former cricket team from Northern Ireland
Milpark, an area of Johannesburg, South Africa